Yasmeen Khair (born 27 June 1987) is a Jordanian footballer who plays as a defender for local Women's League club Shabab Al-Ordon and the Jordan women's national team. She is as well a former Arab gold medalist of the Jordanian National Gymnastics team.

Yasmeen competed in eleven international matches in a total of three international tournament: four qualifying matches for 2010 in China, three group stage matches for 2014 in Vietnam, three group stage matches for 2018 in Jordan, and one friendlies women match with Japan in 2017.

Yasmeen was a member of the Jordanian National Gymnastics Team until she was 16. She has been crowned four-time Arab gold medalist, three-time West Asia gold medalist and five-time youth gymnastics Gold medalist. Currently, Khair plays as a defender for the Jordan national women's football team and the Shabab Al-Ordon women’s team. And a staunch advocate for women’s empowerment and a trailblazer in women’s sports in Jordan and the region, Khair served as one of the Ambassadors of FIFA U-17 Women’s World Cup that was held in Jordan 2016.

Over the course of two decades, Khair overcame several obstacles before cementing her standing as a reputable female athlete, as proven by her winning the title of Best Jordanian Athlete in 2004. Despite norms and traditions, Khair decided to follow her sporting passion, football, by participating in numerous local, regional and international tournaments including the first West Asian Football Federation (WAFF) Women's championship, Arab Women's Championship, AFC Women's Asian Cup and Olympic Games 2015 qualifiers. As a strong female role model, Khair is dedicated to inspiring and empowering young girls by helping Jordan grow the game of football into a viable career option for future female players.

References

External links 
 

Living people
Jordanian women's footballers
Jordan women's international footballers
Women's association football defenders
Footballers at the 2006 Asian Games
Footballers at the 2010 Asian Games
Footballers at the 2014 Asian Games
1987 births
Asian Games competitors for Jordan
Jordan Women's Football League players